Streets named after Ferdinand Foch can be found in many cities of France and in many other places around the world.
Marshal Ferdinand Foch (1851-1929) was Supreme Allied Commander during the First World War.

The following is a list of streets honouring Ferdinand Foch around the world.

Places

Belgium 
 Avenue Maréchal Foch, a street in the Schaerbeek municipality of Bruxelles
 Fochlaan, in Knokke-Heist
 Maarschalk Fochlaan, in Ypres
 Maarschalk Fochstraat, in Leopoldsburg

Canada 
 Rue Foch, Verdun in Montréal
 Rue Maréchal-Foch, quartier St-Sacrement in Québec

China 
 Central Yan'an Road, a road in Shanghai, China, called Avenue Foch between 1920 and 1943

France 
 Avenue Foch, a street in Nancy
 Avenue Foch, a street in Lille
 Avenue Foch, a street in Lyon
 Avenue Foch, a street in Metz
 Avenue Foch, a street in La Garenne-Colombes
 Avenue Foch, a street in Havre
 Avenue Foch, a street in Brest
 Avenue Foch, a street in Dijon
 Avenue Foch, a street in Saumur
 Avenue Foch, a street in Nice
 Avenue Foch, a street in Montmorency, Val-d'Oise
 Avenue Foch, a street in Vernon, a municipality in the Normandy region of northern France
 Avenue Maréchal Foch, a street in Brive-la-Gaillarde
 Avenue du Maréchal-Foch, a street in Chatou
 Avenue Maréchal Foch, a street in Béziers

Lebanon 
 Rue Foch, a street in Beyrouth

New Zealand 
 Foch Avenue, a street in Auckland

Poland 
 Aleja Marszałka Ferdinanda Focha, a street in Crakow
 Marszałka Ferdynanda Focha, a street in Chrzanów
 Marszałka Ferdynanda Focha, a street in Gdańsk
 Marszałka Ferdynanda Focha, a street in Nowy Dwór Mazowiecki
 Ulica Ferdynanda Focha, a street in Bydgoszcz
 Ulica Focha, a street in Gdynia
 Ferdynanda Focha, a street in Częstochowa
 Marszałka Ferdynanda Focha, a street in Grudziądz
 Ulica Focha, a street in Ostrowiec Świętokrzyski
 Ulica Focha, a street in Pruszków
 Ulica Wybrzeże Focha, a street in Przemyśl
 Marszałka Focha, a street in Radom

Singapore 
 Foch Road, a road in Singapore

United States 
 Marshal Foch, a street in New Orleans
 Foch street, a street in Cambridge, Massachusetts
 Foch Street, a street in Hamden, Connecticut
 Foch Street, a street in Fort Worth, TX

See also 
 Square de l'Avenue-Foch, is a small urban green space in Paris, France
 Jardins de l'Avenue-Foch, a small park in Paris, France
 Gare de l'avenue Foch, a railway station located in the 16th arrondissement of Paris, France

Ferdinand Foch
Ferdinand Foch